Laskár is a village and municipality in Martin District in the Žilina Region of northern Slovakia.

History
In historical records the village was first mentioned in 2015.

Geography
The municipality lies at an altitude of 455 metres and covers an area of 3.341 km². It has a population of about 137 people as of 2016.

References

External links
https://web.archive.org/web/20080111223415/http://www.statistics.sk/mosmis/eng/run.html

Villages and municipalities in Martin District